Pero is a station on Line 1 of the Milan Metro. The station is located on Via Olona, which is in Pero, Italy. It was opened on 19 December 2005 on the section between Molino Dorino and Rho Fiera, which was already in operation. It is an underground station.

References

Line 1 (Milan Metro) stations
Railway stations opened in 2005
2005 establishments in Italy
Railway stations in Italy opened in the 21st century